Mañio is a common name that may refer to the following trees of the Valdivian temperate rainforest: 
Saxegothaea conspicua
Podocarpus nubigenus
Podocarpus salignus